Komayanvalasu is a village in Perundurai taluk of Erode district in the Indian state of Tamil Nadu. It is located 8 km away from National Highway 544 between Salem and Coimbatore.  It is 18 km from Gobichettipalayam, 18 km from Erode and 10 km from Perundurai.

Agriculture 
The economy of Komayanvalasu centers on agriculture, viz paddy, sugarcane, plantain, tobacco and turmeric.

Villages in Erode district